Chithrabhumi is a film magazine in Malayalam published from Kozhikode, Kerala. It is part the Mathrubhumi group. The magazine was started in 1982.

References

https://en.m.wikipedia.org/wiki/File:Chitrabhoomi.jpg
1982 establishments in Kerala
Film magazines published in India
Magazines established in 1982
Malayalam-language magazines
Mass media in Kerala
Weekly magazines published in India